This is a list of township-level divisions of the province of Liaoning, People's Republic of China (PRC). After province, prefecture, and county-level divisions, township-level divisions constitute the formal fourth-level administrative divisions of the PRC. There are a total of 1,502 such divisions in Liaoning, divided into 526 subdistricts, 585 towns, 4 ethnic towns, 313 townships, and 74 ethnic townships. This list is divided first into the prefecture-level divisions then the county-level divisions.

Shenyang

Dadong District
Subdistricts:
Wanquan Subdistrict, Guancheng Subdistrict, Chang'an Subdistrict, Dongta Subdistrict, Xindong Subdistrict, Zhulin Subdistrict, Xiaodong Subdistrict, Xiaojinqiao Subdistrict, Dabei Subdistrict, Xiaobei Subdistrict, Taochang Subdistrict, Liaoshen Subdistrict, Dongzhan Subdistrict, Ertaizi Subdistrict, Wenguan Subdistrict

Dongling District
Subdistricts:
Nanta Subdistrict, Quanyuan Subdistrict, Maguanqiao Subdistrict, Fengle Subdistrict, Huishan Subdistrict, Dongling Subdistrict, Yingda Subdistrict, Qianjin Subdistrict, Donghu Subdistrict, Wusan Subdistrict, East Hunhe Station Subdistrict, West Hunhe Station Subdistrict

Towns:
Taoxian, Gaokan, Zhujiatun, Shenjingzi, Lixiang, Baita

Townships:
Wangbingou Township, Mantang Manchu Ethnic Township

Heping District
Subdistricts:
Nanzhan Subdistrict, Yunji Subdistrict, Minzhu Subdistrict, Suichuan Subdistrict, Shengli Subdistrict, Xita Subdistrict, Xinxing Subdistrict, Nanhu Subdistrict, Maluwan Subdistrict, Shashan Subdistrict, Beidaokou Subdistrict, Zhonghua Road Subdistrict, Xinhua Subdistrict, Beizhan Subdistrict, Jixian Subdistrict, Yuanlu Subdistrict, Beishi Subdistrict, Wusong Subdistrict, Bajing Subdistrict, Shisiwei Road Subdistrict, Changbai Subdistrict

Huanggu District
Subdistricts:
Liaohe Subdistrict, Shouquan Subdistrict, Santaizi Subdistrict, Minglian Subdistrict, Tawan Subdistrict, Huanghe Subdistrict, Lingbei Subdistrict, Huashan Subdistrict, Xinle Subdistrict, Sandongqiao Subdistrict, Shelita Subdistrict, Beita Subdistrict, Lingdong Subdistrict

Shenhe District
Subdistricts:
Xinbeizhan Subdistrict, Zhujianlu Subdistrict, Huangcheng Subdistrict, Daxi Subdistrict, Shandongmiao Subdistrict, Fengyutan Subdistrict, Binhe Subdistrict, Wanlian Subdistrict, Danan Subdistrict, Wulihe Subdistrict

Sujiatun District
Subdistricts:
Jiefang Subdistrict, Tieyou Subdistrict, Minzhu Subdistrict, Linhu Subdistrict, Zhongxing Subdistrict, Huxi Subdistrict, Chengjiao

Towns:
Chenxiangtun, Shilihe, Honglingpu, Linshengpu, Bayi, Yaoqianhutun, Shahebao

Townships:
Wanggangbao Township, Yongle Township, Baiqingzhai Township, Tonggou Township, Dagou Township

Tiexi District, Shenyang
Subdistricts:
Lingkong Subdistrict, Qinggong Subdistrict, Weigong Subdistrict, Seventh Road Subdistrict, Twelfth Road Subdistrict, Luguan Subdistrict, Qixian Subdistrict, Xinggong Subdistrict, Qigong Subdistrict, Jihong Subdistrict, Chonggong Subdistrict, Xinghua Subdistrict, Gongrencun Subdistrict, Guihe Subdistrict, Xingshun Subdistrict, Yanfen Subdistrict, Dugong Subdistrict, Xingqi Subdistrict, Baogong Subdistrict, Yunfeng Subdistrict

Yuhong District
Subdistricts:
Yingbin Road Subdistrict, Shenliao Road Subdistrict, Lingxi Subdistrict, Yuhong Subdistrict, Yangshi Subdistrict, Beiling Subdistrict, Lingdong Subdistrict, Shaling Subdistrict, Nanyanghu Subdistrict, Chengdonghu Subdistrict, Pingluo Subdistrict, Masanjia Subdistrict, Zaohua Subdistrict, Guanghui Subdistrict

Xinmin
Subdistricts:
Dongcheng Subdistrict, Xicheng Subdistrict, Liaobin Subdistrict, Xinliu Subdistrict, Xincheng Subdistrict

Towns:
Dahongqi, Liangshan, Daliutun, Gongzhutun, Xinglong, Xinglongbao, Hutai, Fahaniu, Qiandangbao, Damintun, Liuhegou, Gaotaizi

Townships:
Jinwutaizi Township, Hongqi Township, Lutun Township, Yaobao Township, Zhoutuozi Township, Yujiawobao Township, Xinnongcun Township, Dongsheshanzi Township, Taotun Township, Luojiafangzi Township, Sandaogangzi Township, Zhangjiatun Township

Faku County
Towns:
Faku, Yemaotao, Xiushuihezi, Dengshibaozi, Baijiagou, Dagujiazi, Sanmianchuan, Dingjiafang

Townships:
Fengbeibao Township, Ci'ensi Township, Shuangtaizi Township, Woniushi Township, Heping Township, Wutaizi Township, Shijianfang Township, Yiniubaozi Township, Baojiatun Township, Mengjia Township, Hongwuyue Township, Sijiazi Mongol Ethnic Township

Kangping County
Towns:
Kangping, Dongguantun, Zhangqiang, Xiaochengzi, Fangjiatun, Haoguantun, Erniusuokou

Townships:
Liangjiazi Township, Beisijiazi Township, Shandongtun Township, Haizhouwobao Township, Shajintai Mongol and Manchu Ethnic Township, Liushutun Mongol and Manchu Ethnic Township, Dongsheng Manchu and Mongol Ethnic Township, Xiguantun Manchu and Mongol Ethnic Township

Liaozhong County
Towns:
Liaozhong, Ciyutuo, Yujiafang, Zhujiafang, Lengzibao, Liu'erbao, Manduhu, Yangshigang, Xiaozhaimen, Chengjiao, Liujianfang, Yangshibao, Panjiabao, Laoguantuo

Townships:
Laodafang Township, Daheigangzi Township, Niuxintuo Township

Dalian

Ganjingzi District
Subdistricts:
Zhoushuizi Subdistrict, Jiaojinshan Subdistrict, Ganjingzi Subdistrict, Nanguanling Subdistrict, Paoai Subdistrict, Zhonghua Road Subdistrict, Airport Subdistrict, Xinzhaizi Subdistrict, Hongqi Subdistrict, Lingshui Subdistrict, Dalianwan Subdistrict, Quanshui Subdistrict, Gezhenpu Subdistrict, Yingchengzi Subdistrict, Qixianling Subdistrict

Jinzhou District
Subdistricts:
Yongzheng Subdistrict, Youyi Subdistrict, Guangzhong Subdistrict, Maqiaozi Subdistrict, Haiqingdao Subdistrict, Dagushan Subdistrict, Zhanqian Subdistrict, Xianjin Subdistrict, Dongjiagou Subdistrict, Jinshitan Subdistrict, Wanli Subdistrict, Ershilipu Subdistrict, Liangjiadian Subdistrict, Dengshahe Subdistrict, Daweijia Subdistrict, Xingshu Subdistrict, Qidingshan Subdistrict, Huajia Subdistrict, Xiangying Subdistrict, Dalijia Subdistrict, Desheng Subdistrict, Paotai Subdistrict, Fuzhouwan Subdistrict, Sanshilipu Subdistrict, Shihe Subdistrict

Lüshunkou District
Subdistricts:
Dengfeng Subdistrict, Desheng Subdistrict, Shuishiying Subdistrict, Longwangtang Subdistrict, Tieshan Subdistrict, Shuangdaowan Subdistrict, Sanjianpu Subdistrict, Changcheng Subdistrict, Longtou Subdistrict

Pulandian District
Subdistricts:
Fengrong Subdistrict, Tiexi Subdistrict, Taiping Subdistrict, Pikou Subdistrict, Chengzitan Subdistrict, Daliujia Subdistrict, Yangshufang Subdistrict, Datan Subdistrict, Tangjiafang Subdistrict, Lianshan Subdistrict, Anbo Subdistrict, Shabao Subdistrict, Xingtai Subdistrict, Mopan Subdistrict, Tongyi Subdistrict, Lejia Subdistrict, Shuangta Subdistrict, Siping Subdistrict

Shahekou District
Subdistricts:
Xi'an Road Subdistrict, Chunliu Subdistrict, Malan Subdistrict, Nanshahekou Subdistrict, Heishijiao Subdistrict, Lijia Subdistrict, Xinghaiwan Subdistrict

Xigang District
Subdistricts:
Xianglujiao Subdistrict, Rixin Subdistrict, Bayi Road Subdistrict, People's Square Subdistrict, Baiyun Subdistrict,

Zhongshan District
Subdistricts:
Navy Square Subdistrict, Renmin Road Subdistrict, Qingniwaqiao Subdistrict, Kuiying Subdistrict, Taoyuan Subdistrict, Laohutan Subdistrict

Wafangdian
Subdistricts:
Xinhua Subdistrict, Wenlan Subdistrict, Lingdong Subdistrict, Gongji Subdistrict, Tiedong Subdistrict, Zhuhua Subdistrict, Gangdian Subdistrict, Taiyang Subdistrict, Changxingdao Subdistrict, Jiulong Subdistrict, Jiaoliudao Subdistrict

Towns:
Fuzhoucheng, Songshu, Delisi, Wanjialing, Xutun, Yongning, Xietun, Laohutun, Hongyanhe, Liguan, Xianyuwan, Yuantai, Wawo

Townships:
Zhaotun Township, Tucheng Township, Liaoning, Yandian Township, Xiyang Township, Tuoshan Township, Paoai Township

Ethnic Townships:
 Santai Manchu Ethnic Township, Yangjia Manchu Township

Zhuanghe
Subdistricts:
 Chengguan Subdistrict, Xinhua Subdistrict, Xingda Subdistrict, Changsheng Subdistrict, Mingyang Subdistrict

Towns:
 Qingdui, Xuling, Heidao, Lizifang, Daying, Taling, Xianrendong, Ronghuashan, Changling, Hehuashan, Chengshan, Guangmingshan, Dazheng, Wulu , Wangjia

Townships:
 Anzishan Township, Buyunshan Township, Landian Township, Shicheng Township

Ethnic Townships:
 Taipingling Manchu Ethnic Township, Guiyunhua Manchu Ethnic Township

Changhai County
Towns:
Dachangshandao, Zhangzidao, Guangludao, Xiaochangshandao, Haiyangdao

Anshan

Lishan District
Subdistricts:
Lishan Subdistrict, Youhao Subdistrict, Shuangshan District, Shuguang Subdistrict, Lingshan Subdistrict, Anshan, Shenbei Subdistrict, Shennan Subdistrict, Shahe Subdistrict

Towns:
Shahe, Qidashan

Qianshan District
Towns:
Dong'anshan, Tangjiafang, Ganquan, Datun, Tanggangzi

Tiedong District
Subdistricts:
Dongchangdian Subdistrict, Changdian Subdistrict, Hunan Subdistrict, Changqing Subdistrict, Jiefang Subdistrict, Shannan Subdistrict, Yuanlin Subdistrict, Shengli Subdistrict, Zhanqian Subdistrict Subdistrict, Gangcheng Subdistrict, Heping Subdistrict, Duilu Subdistrict

Tiexi District, Anshan
Subdistricts:
Yongle Subdistrict, Gonghe Subdistrict, Xingsheng Subdistrict, Bajiazi Subdistrict, Qiming Subdistrict, Fanrong Subdistrict, Xintao Subdistrict, Dalu Subdistrict, Beitaoguan Subdistrict, Nanhua Subdistrict, Yongfa Subdistrict

Haicheng
Subdistricts:
Haizhou Subdistrict, Xinghai Subdistrict, Xiangtang Subdistrict, Dongsi Subdistrict

Towns:
Gushan, Chagou, Jiewen, Ximu, Mafeng, Pailou, Yingluo, Bali, Maoqi, Wangshi, Nantai, Xiliu, Ganwang, Zhongxiao, Niuzhuang, Teng'ao, Gengzhuang, Xisi, Gaotuo, Wangtai, Wenxiang

Tai'an County
Towns:
Tai'an, Gaolifang, Huangshatuo, Xinkaihe, Sanglin, Jiucaitai, Xintai, Fujia, Huandong, Xifo, Daniu

Xiuyan Manchu Autonomous County
Towns:
Xiuyan, Pianling, Suzigou, Huanghuadian, Sanjiazi, Shimiaozi, Dayingzi, Yanghe, Xindian, Hadabei, Yangjiabao, Yanggou, Qianyingzi, Longtan, Shihuiyao, Muniu, Yaoshan, Dafangshen, Chaoyang, Qingliangshan

Townships:
Hongqiyingzi Township, Linggou Township, Shaozihe Township

Benxi

Mingshan District
Subdistricts: 
Jinshan Subdistrict, Dongxing Subdistrict, Xinming Subdistrict, Gaoyu Subdistrict, Mingshan Subdistrict, Niuxintai Subdistrict, Beidi Subdistrict

Towns:
Wolong, Gaotaizi

Nanfen District
Subdistricts:
Tieshan Subdistrict, Nanfen Subdistrict

The only town is Xiamatang

Townships:
Nanfen Township, Sishanling Manchu Ethnic Township

Pingshan District
Subdistricts:
Dongming Subdistrict, Pingshan Subdistrict, Cuidong Subdistrict, Zhanqian Subdistrict, Gongren Subdistrict, Qianjin Subdistrict, Nandi Subdistrict, Beitai Subdistrict

The only town is Qiaotou

Xihu District
Subdistricts:
Hedong Subdistrict, Hexi Subdistrict, Caitun Subdistrict, Caibei Subdistrict, Shujing Subdistrict, Dongfeng Subdistrict

Towns: 
Huolianzhai, Shiqiaozi, Waitoushan

The only township is Zhangqizhai Township

Benxi Manchu Autonomous County
The only subdistrict is Guanyinge Subdistrict

Towns:
Xiaoshi, Tianshifu, Caohekou, Lianshanguan, Qinghecheng, Nandian, Jianchang, Caohecheng, Pianling, Caohezhang, Gaoguan

The only township is Dongyingfang Township

Huanren Manchu Autonomous County
The only subdistrict is Bafengcheng Subdistrict

Towns:
Huanren, Pulebao, Erpengdianzi, Shajianzi, Wulidianzi, Balidianzi, Hualai, Gucheng

Townships:
Yahe Korean Ethnic Township, Xiangyang Township, Heigou Township, Beidianzi Township

Chaoyang

Longcheng District
Subdistricts:
Mashan Subdistrict, Xiangyang Subdistrict, Xinhua Subdistrict, Banlashan Subdistrict

Towns:
Qidaoquanzi, Xidayingzi, Zhaoduba, Hedapingfang

Townships:
Bianzhangzi Township, Helianhe Township

Shuangta District
Subdistricts:
Nanta Subdistrict, Beita Subdistrict, Guangming Subdistrict, Linghe Subdistrict, Qianjin Subdistrict Subdistrict, Zhanqian Subdistrict, Longshan Subdistrict, Yanbei Subdistrict, Hongqi Subdistrict, Lingfeng Subdistrict

Towns:
Talagao, Taohuatu

Townships:
Changbaoyingzi Township, Sunjiawan Township

Beipiao
Subdistricts:
Nanshan Subdistrict, Taiji Subdistrict, Sanbao Subdistrict, Qiaobei Subdistrict, Chengguan Subdistrict, Guanshan Subdistrict, Dongtaiji Subdistrict

Towns:
Baoguolao, Heichengzi, Xiguanying, Shangyuan, Wujianfang, Daban

Townships:
Dongguanying Township, Sanbao Township, Quanjuyong Township, Sanbaoying Township, Beitazi Township, Taijiying Township, Loujiadian Township, Beisijia Township, Changheying Township, Xiaotazi Township, Dasanjiazi Township, Mengguying Township, Longtan Township, Changgao Township, Batuying Township, Ha'ernao Township, Zhangguying Township, Liangshuihe Mongol Ethnic Township, Mayouying Manchu Ethnic Township

Lingyuan
Subdistricts:
Nanjie Subdistrict, Beijie Subdistrict, Chengguanzhen Subdistrict, Xingyuan Subdistrict, Dongcheng Subdistrict, Lingbei Subdistrict, Hongshan Subdistrict, Reshuitang Subdistrict

Towns:
Wanyuandian, Songzhangzi, Sanshijiazi, Yangzhangzi, Dao'erdeng, Songlingzi, Siguanyingzi, Goumenzi, Xiaochengzi, Sihedang, Wulanbai

Townships:
Liuzhangzi Township, Sandaohezi Township, Niuyingzi Township, Beilu Township, Hekanzi Township, Dawangzhangzi Township, Foyedong Township, Wafangdian Township, Dahebei Township, Qianjin Township, Sanjiazi Mongol Ethnic Township

Chaoyang County
Towns:
Liucheng, Damiao, Wafangzi, Liujiazi, Dapingfang, Boluochi, Mutouchengzi, Ershijiazi, Yangshan

Townships:
Lianhe Township, Dongdatun Township, Qidaoling Township, Beigoumen Township, Beisijiazi Township, Wulanhe Township, Dongdadao Township, Heiniu Township, Gende Township, Wangyingzi Township, Shangzhi Township, Nanshuangmiao Township, Songlingmen Township, Gushanzi Township, Shengli Township, Taizi Township

Harqin Left Wing Mongol Autonomous County
Townships:
Dachengzi, Zhongsanjia, Gongyingzi, Liuguanyingzi, Nanshao, Laoyemiao, Nangongyingzi, Pingfangzi, Shanjuzi, Baitazi, Shanzuizi

Townships:
Wohugou Township, Ganzhao Township, Shuiquan Township, Xinglongzhuang Township, Dayingzi Township, Kunduyingzi Township, Yangjiaogou Township, Youzhangzi Township, Shi'erdebao Township, Caochang Township, Dongshao Township

Jianping County
Towns:
Tubaishou, Zhulike, Jianping, Heishui, Kalaqin, Shahai, Wanshou, Haladaokou, Reshui, Laoguandi, Bei'ershijiazi Hui Town

Townships:
Fushan Township, Shenjing Township, Yushulinzi Township, Gushanzi Township, Qingsongling Township, Yangcunling Township, Huizhou Township, Machang Township, Luofugou Township, Shaoguoyingzi Township, Xiangyang Township, Taipingzhuang Township, Baishan Township, Kuidesuo Township, Zhangjiayingzi Township, Xiaotang Township, Baijiawa Township, Yichenggong Township, Qingfengshan Township, Bajia Township, Sanjia Mongol Ethnic Township

Dandong

Yuanbao District
Subdistricts:
Liudaokou Subdistrict, Qidao Subdistrict, Badao Subdistrict, Jiudao Subdistrict, Guangji Subdistrict, Xingdong Subdistrict

The only town is Jinshan

Zhen'an District
Subdistricts:
Yalu River Subdistrict, Zhenzhu Subdistrict, Taiping Bay Subdistrict, Jinkuang Subdistrict

Towns:
Wulongbei, Loufang, Tangshancheng, Tongxing, Jiuliancheng

Zhenxing District
Subdistricts:
Yongchang Subdistrict, Liudaogou Subdistrict, Toudao Bridge Subdistrict, Xianwei Subdistrict, Linjiang Subdistrict, Huayuan Subdistrict, Zhanqian Subdistrict, Maokuishan Subdistrict, Xicheng Subdistrict

The only town is Tangchi

Fengcheng
Subdistricts:
Fenghuangcheng Subdistrict, Fengshan Subdistrict, Caohe Subdistrict

Towns:
Qingchengzi, Tongyuanbao, Aiyang, Saima, Jiguanshan, Bianmen, Hongqi, Dixiongshan, Dongtang, Liujiahe, Baoshan, Lanqi, Baiqi, Simenzi, Shicheng, Shalizhai, Daxing

The only township is Dabao Mongol Ethnic Township

Donggang
Subdistricts:
Dadong Subdistrict, Xincheng Subdistrict, Xinxing Subdistrict

Towns:
Gushan, Qianyang, Changshan, Beijingzi, Yiquan, Huangtukan, Majiadian, Pusamiao, Longwangmiao, Xiaodianzi, Chang'an, Xinnong, Heigou, Shizijie

The only township is Helong Manchu Ethnic Township

Kuandian Manchu Autonomous County
Towns:
Kuandian, Guanshui, Taipingshao, Yongdian, Changdian, Maodianzi, Qingshangou, Hongshi, Niumaowu, Dachuantou, Bahechuan, Shuangshanzi, Daxicha, Budayuan, Zhenjiang, Qingyishan, Yangmuchuan, Hushan, Penghai

Townships:
Gulouzi Township, Shihugou Township, Xialuhe Korean Ethnic Township

Fushun

Dongzhou District
Subdistricts:
Dongzhou Subdistrict, Xintun Subdistrict, Zhangdian Subdistrict, Dalian Subdistrict, Longfeng Subdistrict, Wanxin Subdistrict, Laohutai Subdistrict, Pingshan Subdistrict, Nanhuayuan Subdistrict, Liushan Subdistrict

Townships:
Nianpan Township, Qianjin Township

Shuncheng District
Subdistricts:
Changchun Subdistrict, Hedong Subdistrict, Xinhua Subdistrict, Fushuncheng Subdistrict, Jiangjunbao Subdistrict, Gebu Subdistrict

The only town is Qiandian

Townships:
Hebei Township, Huiyuan Township

Wanghua District
Subdistricts:
Jianshe Subdistrict, Wulaotun Subdistrict, Guchengzi Subdistrict, Binwu Subdistrict, Putun Subdistrict, Guangming Subdistrict, Heping Subdistrict, Gongnong Subdistrict, Tiantun Subdistrict, Xinmin Subdistrict

The only town is Tayu (town)

Xinfu District
Subdistricts:
Zhanqian Subdistrict, Fumin Subdistrict, Xinfu Subdistrict, Yong'antai Subdistrict, East Park Subdistrict, Yulin Subdistrict

Fushun County
Towns:
Zhangdang, Shiwen, Hou'an, Hada

Townships:
Xiahe Township, Jiubing Township, Hailang Township, Maquanzi Township, Shangma Township, Lanshan Township, Lagu Manchu Ethnic Township, Tangtu Manchu Ethnic Township

Qingyuan Manchu Autonomous County
Towns:
Qingyuan, Dagujia, Hongtoushan, Ying'emen, Nanshancheng, Nankouqian, Caoshi, Xiajiabao, Wandianzi

Townships:
Tukouzi Township, Beisanjia Township, Aojiabao Township, Dasuhe Township, Gounai Township

Xinbin Manchu Autonomous County
Towns:
Xinbin, Xiayingzi, Dasiping, Shangjiahe, Muqi, Pingdingshan, Yongling, Weiziyu, Nanzamu, Wangqingmen

Townships:
Xiajiahe Township, Besisiping Township, Hongsheng Township, Hongmiaozi Township, Tangtu Township, Chengjiao Township, Xiangshuihezi Township, Xiayuan Township, Yushu Township, Jiahe Township

Fuxin

Haizhou District
Subdistricts:
Heping Subdistrict, Xinxing Subdistrict, Xishan Subdistrict, Hebei Subdistrict, Zhanqian Subdistrict, West Fuxin Subdistrict, Wulong Subdistrict, Gongrencun Subdistrict

The only town is Hanjiadian

Qinghemen District
Subdistricts:
Xinbei Subdistrict, Liutai Subdistrict, Aiyou Subdistrict, Qinghe Subdistrict

Towns:
Wulongba, Hexi

Taiping District
Subdistricts:
Hongshu Subdistrict, Meihai Subdistrict, Gaode Subdistrict, Chengnan Subdistrict, Sunjiawan Subdistrict

The only town is Shuiquan

Xihe District
Subdistricts:
Xiyuan Subdistrict, Beiyuan Subdistrict, Dongyuan Subdistrict, Xueyuan Subdistrict, Huadong Subdistrict, Zhongyuan Subdistrict

The only town is Sihe

Xinqiu District
Subdistricts:
Jieji Subdistrict, Beibu Subdistrict, Zhongbu Subdistrict, Nanbu Subdistrict, Xinglong Subdistrict

The only town is Changyingzi

Fuxin Mongol Autonomous County
Towns:
Shijiazi, Yusi, Daba, Wangfu, Dongliang, Jiumiao, Wuhuanchi, Tabenzhalan, Yimatu, Fosi, Paozi, Jianshe, Furong

Townships:
Qijiazi Township, Bajiazi Township, Shiwujiazi Township, Daban Township, Daguben Township, Taiping Township, Zhalanyingzi Township, Huashige Township, Ping'andi Township, Laohetu Township, Hongmaozi Township, Cangtu Township, Shala Township, Zhaoshugou Township, Guohua Township, Wofenggou Township, Hadahushao Township, Zidutai Township, Tayingzi Township, Xinmin Township, Fuxingdi Township, Zhizhushan Township

Zhangwu County
Towns:
Zhangwu, Ha'ertao, Zhanggutai, Dongliujiazi, Wufeng, Fengjia, Houxinqiu, A'erxiang

Townships:
Liangjiazi Township, Shuangmiao Township, Ping'an Township, Mantanghong Township, Sibaozi Township, Fengtian Township, Qianfuxingdi Township, Xinglongbao Township, Xinglongshan Township, Dasijiazi Township, Sihecheng Township, Dade Township, Weizigou Mongol Ethnic Township, Erdaohezi Mongol Ethnic Township, Xiliujiazi Mongol and Manchu Ethnic Township, Daleng Mongol Ethnic Township

Huludao

Lianshan District
Subdistricts:
Xinggong Subdistrict, Bohai Subdistrict, Huaji Subdistrict, Lianshan Subdistrict, Shuini Subdistrict, Zhanqian Subdistrict, Huagong Subdistrict, Shiyou Subdistrict, Jinjiao Subdistrict, Yangjiazhangzi Economic and Technological Development Zone

Towns:
Taijitun, Si'erbao, Jinxing, Gangtun, Hongluoxian, Gaoqiao, Xintaimen Mongol Town

Townships:
Shanshenmiaozi Township, Baimashi Township, Shaheying Township, Guzhuyingzi Township, Yangjiao Township, Zhangxianggongtun Township, Tashan Township, Daxing Township

Longgang District
Subdistricts:
Shuanglong Subdistrict, East Subdistrict, West Subdistrict, Binhai Subdistrict, Wanghaisi Subdistrict, Huludao Subdistrict, Longwan Subdistrict, Beigang Subdistrict, Lianwan Subdistrict, Yuhuang Subdistrict

Nanpiao District
Subdistricts:
Jiulong Subdistrict, Jiulong Subdistrict, Qiupigou Subdistrict, Xiaolinghe Subdistrict, Zhaojiatun Subdistrict, Weizigou Subdistrict, Shaguotun Subdistrict, Sanjiazi Subdistrict

Towns:
Nuanchitang, Gangyaoling

Townships:
Shaguotun Township, Huangtukan Township

Xingcheng
Subdistricts:
Gucheng Subdistrict, Ningyuan Subdistrict, Diaoyutai Subdistrict, Chengdong Subdistrict, Wenquan Subdistrict, Sijiatun Subdistrict, Huashan Subdistrict

Towns:
Dongxinzhuang, Shahousuo, Guojia, Caozhuang

Townships:
Shuangshu Township, Juhuadao Township, Dazhai Manchu Ethnic Township, Sandaogou Manchu Ethnic Township, Yuantaizi Manchu Ethnic Township, Baita Manchu Ethnic Township, Jiumen Manchu Ethnic Township, Yang'an Manchu Ethnic Township, Liutaizi Manchu Ethnic Township, Hongyazi Manchu Ethnic Township, Nandashan Manchu Ethnic Township, Yaowang Manchu Ethnic Township, Gaojialing Manchu Ethnic Township, Haibin Manchu Ethnic Township, Wanghai Manchu Ethnic Township, Jianchang Manchu Ethnic Township, Weizhan Manchu Ethnic Township

Jianchang County
Towns:
Jianchang, Bajiazi, Lamadong, Yaowangmiao, Tangshenmiao, Linglongta, Datun

Townships:
Maoniuyingzi Township, Yaolugou Township, Shifo Township, Suozhuyingzi Township, Xijianchang Township, Shihuiyaozi Township, Wangbaoyingzi Township, Weijialing Township, Laodazhangzi Township, Toudaoyingzi Township, Xinkailing Township, Hezhangzi Township, Yangmadianzi Township, Heshangfangzi Township, Yangshuwanzi Township, Heishanke Township, Leijiadian Township, Bashihan Township, Xiaodeyingzi Township, Niangniangmiao Township, Guzhangzi Township, Erdaowanzi Mongol Ethnic Township

Suizhong County
Towns:
Suizhong, Qianwei, Wanjia, Qiansuo, Gaoling, Tashantun, Xidianzi, Wangbao, Huangdi, Kuanbang, Dawangmiao, Xiaozhuangzi, Gaotai, Shahe

Townships:
Qiuzigou Township, Jiabeiyan Township, Yong'anbao Township, Lijiabao Township, Chengjiao Township, Xipingpo Manchu Ethnic Township, Gejia Manchu Ethnic Township, Gaodianzi Manchu Ethnic Township, Fanjia Manchu Ethnic Township, Wanghu Manchu Ethnic Township, Mingshui Manchu Ethnic Township

Jinzhou

Guta District
Subdistricts:
Tian'an Subdistrict, Shiyou Subdistrict, Beijie Subdistrict, Bao'an Subdistrict, Raoyang Subdistrict, Nanjie Subdistrict, Zhanqian Subdistrict, Jingye Subdistrict, Shiying Subdistrict

Linghe District
Subdistricts:
Zhengda Subdistrict, Longjiang Subdistrict, Majia Subdistrict, Baigu Subdistrict, Tiexin Subdistrict, Kangning Subdistrict, Ling'an Subdistrict, Juyuan Subdistrict, Jintie Subdistrict, Liuhua Subdistrict, Shiqiaozi Subdistrict

Taihe District
Subdistricts:
Taihe Subdistrict, Xinglong Subdistrict, Tanghezi Subdistrict, Lingxi Subdistrict, Daxue Subdistrict, Wangjia Subdistrict, Tianqiao Subdistrict, Xingshan Subdistrict, Lingnan Subdistrict

Towns:
Niangnianggong, Songshan

Townships:
Nü'erhe Township, Yingpan Township, Xinmin Township

Beizhen
Subdistricts:
Beizhen Subdistrict, Guanyinge Subdistrict

Towns:
Dashi, Zheng'an, Zhong'an, Luoluobao, Changxingdian, Lüyang, Goubangzi, Liaotun, Qingduizi, Gaoshanzi, Zhaotun

Townships:
Futun Township, Baojia Township, Datun Township, Liujia Township, Wujia Township, Guangning Township

Linghai
Subdistricts:
Daling River Subdistrict, Jincheng Subdistrict

Towns:
Shishan, Yuji, Shuangyang, Banjita, Shenjiatai, Santaizi, Youwei Manchu Town, Yanjia, Xinzhuangzi, Niangniangguan, Cuiyan

Townships:
Daye Township, Xibaqian Township, Jianye Township, Wendilou Manchu Ethnic Township, Baitaizi Township, Xietun Township, Antun Township, Banshigou Township

Heishan County
Towns:
Heishan, Xinlitun, Badaohao, Xiaodong, Dahushan, Wuliangdian, Baichangmen, Banlamen, Sijiazi, Fangshan, Lijia, Hujia, Jiangtun, Raoyanghe, Changxing, Xinxing, Taihe

Townships:
Daxing Township, Yingchengzi Township, Duanjia Township, Xuetun Township, Zhen'an Township

Yi County
Towns:
Yizhou, Qilihe, Jiudaoling, Dayushubao, Liulongtai, Gaotaizi, Shaohuyingzi

Townships:
Baimiaozi Township, Toutai Manchu Ethnic Township, Zhangjiabao Township, Qianyang Township, Dadingbao Manchu Ethnic Township, Waziyu Manchu Ethnic Township, Toudaohe Manchu Ethnic Township, Dicangsi Manchu Ethnic Township, Chengguan Manchu Ethnic Township, Liulonggou Manchu Ethnic Township, Juliangtun Manchu Ethnic Township

Liaoyang

Baita District
Subdistricts:
Xuwangzi Subdistrict, Baitangfang Subdistrict, Weiguo Road Subdistrict, Xinghuo Subdistrict, Zhanqian Subdistrict, Wayaozi Subdistrict, Shengli Subdistrict, Yuejin Subdistrict

Gongchangling District
Subdistricts:
Tuanshanzi Subdistrict, Anping Subdistrict, Sujia Subdistrict

The only town is Tanghe

The only township is Anping Township

Hongwei District
Subdistricts:
Changzheng Subdistrict, Xincun Subdistrict, Gongnong Subdistrict, Guanghua Subdistrict

The only town is Shuguang

Taizihe District
Subdistricts:
Wangshuitai Subdistrict, Xinhua Subdistrict

The only town is Qijia

Townships:
Dongningwei Township, Dongjingling Township

Wensheng District
Subdistricts:
Wensheng Subdistrict, Wusheng Subdistrict, Xiangping Subdistrict, Nanmen Subdistrict, Dongxing Subdistrict, Qingyang Subdistrict

Dengta
Subdistricts:
Wanbaoqiao Subdistrict, Yantai Subdistrict, Gucheng Subdistrict

Towns:
Dengta Town, Huazi, Zhangtaizi, Xidayao, Tong'erbao, Shendanbao, Liutiaozhai, Ximafeng, Wangjia, Liuhezi, Luodatai, Dahenan

The only township is Jiguanshan Township

Liaoyang County
Towns:
Shoushan, Mujia, Lanjia, Liuhao, Bahui, Tangmazhai, Hanling, Helan, Xiaobeihe, Liu'erbao, Huangniwa, Longchang, Xinglong

Townships: 
Xiadahe Township, Tianshui Manchu Ethnic Township, Jidongyu Manchu Ethnic Township

Panjin

Dawa District

Subdistricts: Rongbin Subdistrict, Erjiegou Subdistrict, Rongxing Subdistrict, Dawa Subdistrict, Tianjia Subdistrict, Yushu Subdistrict, Xianghai Subdistrict, Qianjin Subdistrict
Towns: Tianzhuangtai, Dongfeng, Xinkai, Qingshui, Xinxing, Xi'an, Xinli, Tangjia, Ping'an Township, Zhaoquanhe

Shuangtaizi District
Subdistricts:
Dongfeng Subdistrict, Shengli Subdistrict, Liaohe Subdistrict, Hongqi Subdistrict, Jianshe Subdistrict, Shiyou Subdistrict, Huagong Subdistrict, Shuangsheng Subdistrict, Tiedong Subdistrict

Xinglongtai District
Subdistricts:
Zhenxing Subdistrict, Xinglong Subdistrict, Bohai Subdistrict, Xingong Subdistrict, Yulou Subdistrict, Gaosheng Subdistrict, Shuguang Subdistrict, Youyi Subdistrict, Hongcun Subdistrict, Ping'an Subdistrict, Xinsheng Subdistrict, Huanxi Subdistrict, Shencai Subdistrict, Cicai Subdistrict, Jincai Subdistrict, Xinghai Subdistrict, Xingsheng Subdistrict, Chuangxin Subdistrict

Panshan County
Towns:
Taiping, Hujia, Gaosheng, Guchengzi, Shaling, Baqiangzi, Yangquanzi, Dongguo, Shixin, Wujia

Townships:
Lujia Township, Tianshui Township, Dahuang Township, Chenjia Township

Tieling

Qinghe District
Subdistricts:
Xiangyang Subdistrict, Hongqi Subdistrict

The only town is Zhangxiang

Townships:
Yangmulinzi Township, Niejia Manchu Ethnic Township

Yinzhou District
Subdistricts:
Hongqi Subdistrict, Gongren Subdistrict, Tongzhong Subdistrict, Chaihe Subdistrict, Tiedong Subdistrict, Tiexi Subdistrict, Liaohai Subdistrict

The only township is Longshan Township

Tieling Economic Development Zone

Diaobingshan
Towns:
Bingshan, Tiefa, Xiaoming, Gushanzi, Xiaonan, Xiaoqing, Daming

Kaiyuan
Subdistricts:
Xincheng Subdistrict, Laocheng Subdistrict, Xingkai Subdistrict

Towns:
Babao, Qingyunbao, Kaoshan, Yemin, Jingouzi, Zhonggu, Bakeshu, Lianhua, Weiyuanbao

Townships:
Chengdong Township, Sanjiazi Township, Songshanbao Township, Majiazhai Township, Lijiatai Township, Shangbadi Manchu Ethnic Township, Xiabadi Manchu Ethnic Township, Huangqizhai Manchu Ethnic Township, Linfeng Manchu Ethnic Township

Changtu County
Towns:
Changtu, Laocheng, Bamiancheng, Sanjiangkou, Jinjia, Baoli, Quantou, Shuangmiaozi, Liangzhongqiao, Mazhonghe, Maojiadian, Laosiping, Dawa, Toudao, Cilushu, Fujia, Sihe, Chaoyang, Guyushu, Qijiazi, Dongga, Simiancheng, Qianshuangjing

Townships:
Daxing Township, Shibajiazi Township, Tongjiangkou Township, Dasijiazi Township, Houyao Township, Changfa Township, Taiping Township, Xia'ertai Township, Ping'anbao Township, Qujiadian Township

Tieling County
Towns:
Aji, Zhenxibao, Xintaizi, Yaobao, Fanhe, Pingdingbao, Dadianzi

Townships:
Cainiu Township, Shuangjingzi Township, Xiongguantun Township, Liqianhu Township, Jiguanshan Township, Hengdaohezi Manchu Ethnic Township, Baiqizhai Manchu Ethnic Township

Xifeng County
Towns:
Xifeng, Pinggang, Gaojiadian, Anmin, Zhenxing, Liangquan, Tiande, Fangmu

Townships:
Taoran Township, Baiyu Township, Diaoyu Township, Gengke Township, Mingde Manchu Ethnic Township, Dexing Manchu Ethnic Township, Chengping Manchu Ethnic Township, Helong Manchu Ethnic Township, Yingchang Manchu Ethnic Township, Jinxing Manchu Ethnic Township

Yingkou

Bayuquan District
Subdistricts:
Honghai Subdistrict, Haixing Subdistrict, Wanghai Subdistrict, Haidong Subdistrict

Towns:
Xiongyue, Lutun, Hongqi

Laobian District
Subdistricts:
Laobian Subdistrict, Chengdong Subdistrict

Towns:
Lunan, Liushu, Laobian Town, Erdaogou

Xishi District
Subdistricts:
Wutaizi Subdistrict, Yushi Subdistrict, Desheng Subdistrict, Qinghua Subdistrict, Hebei Subdistrict, Shengli Subdistrict, Xishichang Subdistrict

Zhanqian District
Subdistricts:
Yuejin Subdistrict, Jianshe Subdistrict, Batiandi Subdistrict, Dongfeng Subdistrict, Xinxing Subdistrict, Jianfeng Subdistrict, Xinjian Subdistrict

Dashiqiao
Subdistricts:
Shiqiao Subdistrict, Qinghua Subdistrict, Jinqiao Subdistrict, Gangdu Subdistrict, Nanlou Subdistrict

Towns:
Shuiyuan, Gouyan, Shifo, Gaokan, Qikou, Huzhuang, Guantun, Boluopu, Yong'an, Tangchi, Huangtuling, Zhoujia

Gaizhou
Subdistricts:
Gulou Subdistrict, Xicheng Subdistrict, Dongcheng Subdistrict, Taiyangsheng Subdistrict, Tuanshan Subdistrict, Xihai Subdistrict

Towns:
Gaotun, Shagang, Jiulongdi, Jiuzhai, Wanfu, Wolongquan, Qingshiling, Nuanquan, Guizhou, Bangshibao, Tuandian, Shuangtai, Yangyun, Xutun, Shenzijie, Kuangdonggou, Chentun, Liangtun,

Townships:
Xiaoshipeng Township, Guoyuan Township, Ertai Township

References

 
Liaoning
Townships